Jaldessa  ("Jal-de-ssa"; which in Oromo literally translates to "Monkeys” due to the monkeys surrounding the area) is a village in eastern Ethiopia, located in the Shinile Zone of the Somali Region of Ethiopia.

The Central Statistical Agency has not published an estimate for the population of this village. It is located in Sitti woreda.

History

Early Modern
Jaldessa is the area of the [Somale -issa under DireDawa cluster] near the border with the Sitti zone somali and with Egyptian support the  seat of the Issa was moved to Jaldessa. In 1875 Egyptian troops set up a fort to secure supply from the coast, and a contingent of Sudanese soldiers was stationed with an Egyptian officer. When the Egyptians entered Jaldessa they had recorded that the Nole oromo controlled the Harar-Berbera trade route. , they also went on to record that the Nole had subjugated the Issa around the city multiple times and that the Issa were scared of the Nole. People built huts around the station, which was fortified with stones and hedgerows, the Somali on one side and the Oromo on the other. The Ugas of Issa, Roble Farah, moved his seat to Jaldessa. Its population increased to 1,500 and doubled or tripled on market days. After the Egyptians left Harar in 1885, Britain took possession of Jaldessa and stationed a garrison of 19 Indians and 20 Somalis. During the 19th century, Jaldessa was an important station on the trade route between Harar and the Red Sea coast. W.C. Barker, writing in 1842, mentions it as a stopping place in the territory of the Nole Oromo, on the caravan route between Zeila and Harar. The party of Italian explorer Count Pietro Porro was ambushed and slaughtered at Jaldessa in April 1886, which provided Menelik II of Shewa with an excuse to attack Harar. Between the Shewan victory at Chelenqo and the foundation of Dire Dawa, Jaldessa was the seat of the local Ethiopian governor, Ato Mersha Nahusenay. The opening of the Addis Ababa - Djibouti Railway and the birth of Dire Dawa diminished the strategic importance of Jaldessa.

Modern
Early in the Ogaden War, Jaldessa was captured by Somali units as they closed in on Dire Dawa; it was recaptured 4 February 1978 by the Ethiopian Ninth Division with Cuban tank and artillery shock troops.

In 2008, the United States of America selected Jaldessa as one of seven locations where servicemen of the Combined Joint Task Force-Horn of Africa worked with Ethiopian veterinarians to vaccinate more than 20,000 animals: cattle were inoculated against blackleg and anthrax, while sheep and goats were inoculated against contagious caprine pleuro-pneumonia and peste des petits ruminants.

See also
Issa
Zeila
Harar
Somali aristocratic and court titles

Notes 

Populated places in the Somali Region